Tofazzal Hossain may refer to:

 Tofazzal Hossain Manik Miah (1911–1969), Bengali journalist and politician
 Tofazzal Hossain (civil servant) (1935–2015), Bangladeshi language activist, civil servant and writer